Live at the Blue Note is a live album by American pianist, composer and bandleader Duke Ellington recorded at The Blue Note nightclub in Chicago for the Roulette label in 1959.

The album was originally released as a single LP and rereleased as a double CD in 1994 with fourteen bonus tracks on the Blue Note label.

Reception
The Allmusic review by Scott Yanow stated: "This two-CD set gives one a good example of how Duke Ellington's Orchestra sounded in 1959. Greatly expanded from the original single LP, the release essentially brings back a full night by the Ellington band, three nearly complete sets. The music ranges from old favorites to some newer material".

Track listing
All compositions by Duke Ellington, except where noted.

Disc 1
 "Take the "A" Train" (Billy Strayhorn) - 3:17 Bonus track on CD reissue  
 "Newport Up" (Ellington, Strayhorn) - 4:40 Bonus track on CD reissue  
 "Haupe" [aka "Polly's Theme"] - 3:58  
 "Flirtibird" - 3:01  
 "Pie Eye's Blues" - 3:16  
 "Almost Cried" - 3:20 Bonus track on CD reissue  
 "Duael Fuel (Dual Filter)" - (Ellington, Clark Terry) - 11:37 Bonus track on CD reissue  
 "Sophisticated Lady" (Ellington, Irving Mills, Mitchell Parish) - 3:56  
 "Mr. Gentle and Mr. Cool" (Shorty Baker, Ellington) - 7:17  
 "El Gato" (Cat Anderson) - 4:13 Bonus track on CD reissue  
 "C Jam Blues" (Barney Bigard, Ellington) - 4:52 Bonus track on CD reissue  
 "Tenderly" (Walter Gross, Jack Lawrence) - 5:30 Bonus track on CD reissue  
 "Honeysuckle Rose" (Andy Razaf, Fats Waller) - 4:20 Bonus track on CD reissue  
 "Drawing Room Blues" (Strayhorn) - 6:05 Bonus track on CD reissue   
 "Tonk" (Ellington, Strayhorn) - 1:57 Bonus track on CD reissue

Disc 2
 "In a Mellow Tone" (Ellington, Milt Gabler) - 2:36  
 "All of Me" (Gerald Marks, Seymour Simons) - 2:31  
 "Things Ain't What They Used to Be (Mercer Ellington) - 2:50  
 "Jeep's Blues" (Ellington, Johnny Hodges) - 3:50  
 "Mood Indigo" (Bigard, Ellington, Mills) - 11:02 Bonus track on CD reissue  
 "Perdido" (Juan Tizol) - 4:32  
 "Satin Doll" (Ellington, Strayhorn, Johnny Mercer) - 4:48 Bonus track on CD reissue   
 A Disarming Visit by June Christy & Stan Kenton - 2:56  
 "Newport Up" (Ellington, Strayhorn) - 5:03 Bonus track on CD reissue   
 "Medley: Black and Tan Fantasy/Creole Love Call/The Mooche" (Ellington, Strayhorn, James "Bubber" Miley) - 9:19  
 "Passion Flower"  (Strayhorn)  5:13  
 "On the Sunny Side of the Street" (Dorothy Fields, Jimmy McHugh) - 4:29  
 "El Gato" (Anderson) - 4:18 Bonus track on CD reissue

Personnel
Duke Ellington – piano (tracks 1.2-2.13)
Billy Strayhorn - piano (tracks 1.1 & 1.14) 
Cat Anderson, Shorty Baker, Willie Cook, Clark Terry - trumpet
Ray Nance - trumpet, violin
Quentin Jackson, Britt Woodman - trombone 
John Sanders - valve trombone
Jimmy Hamilton - clarinet, tenor saxophone
Johnny Hodges - alto saxophone 
Russell Procope - alto saxophone, clarinet
Paul Gonsalves - tenor saxophone
Harry Carney - baritone saxophone
Jimmy Woode - bass (tracks 1.1-2.6 & 2.8-2.13)
Johnny Pate - bass (track 2.7) 
Sam Woodyard - drums
James "Jimmy" Johnson Jr. - drums

References

1959 live albums
Duke Ellington live albums
Roulette Records live albums
Albums recorded at the Blue Note Jazz Club